The 2023 New Zealand Derby was a Group I horse race which was run on Saturday 4 March 2023. It was the 148th running of the New Zealand Derby, and it was won by Sharp 'N' Smart.

Details 

The New Zealand Derby is traditionally staged at Ellerslie Racecourse in Auckland, but was relocated to Te Rapa Racecourse in Hamilton due to extensive track redevelopment work.

Sharp 'N' Smart became the first New Zealand Derby winner for New Zealand Racing Hall of Fame trainer Graeme Rogerson, who has won more races in New Zealand than any other trainer in the history of the sport.

Sharp 'N' Smart was bred by Gerry Harvey and is a son of Westbury Stud stallion Redwood. 

Bought by New Zealand Racing Hall of Fame inductee Graeme Rogerson for $55,000 at the 2021 New Zealand Bloodstock National Yearling Sale at Karaka, Sharp 'N' Smart is raced by Rogerson in partnership with a syndicate that includes Harvey, Merv Butterworth, Craig Leishman and Todd Bawden.

Sharp 'N' Smart brought impressive credentials into the 2023 New Zealand Derby, for which he was rated a $1.40 favourite. 

He had been a Listed winner in New Zealand as a two-year-old, and finished fourth in the Group One J. J. Atkins in Brisbane, while his spring campaign featured a win in Sydney's Spring Champion Stakes and a runner-up finish in the Victoria Derby. He warmed up for his New Zealand Derby assignment with a second placing in the Thorndon Mile and a victory against older horses at weight-for-age in the Herbie Dyke Stakes. 

The Derby brought more of the same, with Sharp 'N' Smart launching a powerful move out of midfield coming towards the home turn. Ridden by Ryan Elliott, the gelding kicked clear in the home straight before holding out the late-finishing Andalus to score by a long neck.

Race details
 Sponsor: Auckland Thoroughbred Racing
 Prize money: NZ$1,000,000
 Track: Good
 Number of runners: 18
 Winner's time: 2:29.47

Full result

Winner's details

Further details of the winner, Sharp 'N' Smart:

 Foaled: 28 September 2019
 Sire: Redwood; Dam: Queen Margaret (Swiss Ace)
 Owner: G A Rogerson, Todd Bawden, C A Leishman, NZ Thoroughbred Holdings Ltd, M & M Butterworth & M B Waddy
 Trainer: Team Rogerson
 Breeder: Gerry Harvey
 Starts: 11
 Wins: 6
 Seconds: 4
 Thirds: 0
 Earnings: $3,027,166

The road to the Derby
Early-season appearances prior to running in the 2021 Derby.

 Sharp 'N' Smart – 1st Gloaming Stakes, 1st Spring Champion Stakes, 2nd Victoria Derby, 2nd Thorndon Mile, 1st Herbie Dyke Stakes
 Andalus - 9th Hawke's Bay Guineas, 7th Avondale Guineas
 Full Of Sincerity - 9th Waikato Guineas, 4th Avondale Guineas
 Waitak - 1st Trevor & Corallie Eagle Memorial, 2nd Auckland Guineas, 4th Waikato Guineas, 2nd Avondale Guineas
 Dynastic - 1st Colin Meads Trophy, 7th Hawke's Bay Guineas, 3rd Sarten Memorial, 7th New Zealand 2000 Guineas, 3rd Auckland Guineas, 7th Karaka Million 3YO Classic, 5th Waikato Guineas
 Desert Lightning - 5th Hawke's Bay Guineas, 4th Sarten Memorial, 2nd New Zealand 2000 Guineas, 5th Uncle Remus Stakes, 3rd Karaka Million 3YO Classic, 1st Avondale Guineas
 Texas - 5th Northland Breeders' Stakes, 8th Uncle Remus Stakes, 7th Auckland Guineas
 Warsaw - 3rd Avondale Guineas
 Devildom - 2nd Gingernuts Salver, 2nd Waikato Guineas, 6th Avondale Guineas
 Channel Surfer - 3rd Hawke's Bay Guineas, 2nd Trevor & Corallie Eagle Memorial, 7th Uncle Remus Stakes, 8th Karaka Million 3YO Classic, 8th Avondale Guineas
 Jaffira - 10th Avondale Guineas
 Dimaggio - 5th Gingernuts Salver, 5th Avondale Guineas
 Cruz Missile - 1st Gingernuts Salver, 11th Herbie Dyke Stakes

Subsequent Group 1 wins
Subsequent wins at Group 1 level by runners in the 2023 New Zealand Derby.

See also
 2022 New Zealand Derby
 2021 New Zealand Derby
 2020 New Zealand Derby
 2019 New Zealand Derby
 2018 New Zealand Derby
 2017 New Zealand Derby
 2016 New Zealand Derby
 2015 New Zealand Derby
 2014 New Zealand Derby
 2013 New Zealand Derby
 2012 New Zealand Derby
 2011 New Zealand Derby
 Recent winners of major NZ 3 year old races

References

2023
2023 in New Zealand sport
March 2023 sports events in New Zealand
2023 in horse racing